The Emancipation of Hugh Masekela is the fifth studio album by South African jazz trumpeter Hugh Masekela. It was recorded in Los Angeles and released in 1966 via Chisa Records label. On this album he performs mostly his own songs. Tracks "Child of the Earth", "Felicidade", and "Ha Lese Le Di Khanna" were later included in his 2004 album Still Grazing.

Reception
Matthew Greenwald of Allmusic stated that "South African expatriate Hugh Masekela was the architect of an extremely interesting and viable musical form, an audacious blending of South African rhythms, swing jazz, and rock & roll. Emancipation is the first American effort in this area, and it's a fantastic, soul-deep affair. With a crack band including Charlie Smalls on piano and two drummers (the original Big Black on percussion), Masekela's vocals and intense trumpet have the perfect platform from which to fly. One track in particular, 'She Doesn't Write,' is almost a template for 'Grazing in the Grass,' which was a huge hit the following year. Masekela was also involved with the Jim Dickson/Byrds/Peter Fonda crowd at the time, and that influence can be felt here as well. A perfect introduction to Hugh Masekela."

Track listing

Personnel
John Cartwright – bass
Big Black – congas
Chuck Carter – drums
Stan Ross – engineer 
Gabor Halmos – photography
Jonathan Haze – photography
Charlie Smalls – piano
Stewart Levine – producer
Hugh Masekela – trumpet (uncredited)

References

External links

1966 albums
MGM Records albums
Hugh Masekela albums
Albums produced by Stewart Levine
Albums recorded at Gold Star Studios